Shue is a surname. It may be an Americanized spelling of the German surnames Schue or Schuh. Additionally, it is an ad hoc romanization of various Chinese surnames, including those spelled in pinyin as Xǔ and Xuē.

The 2010 United States Census found 3,155 people with the surname Shue, making it the 10,215th-most-common name in the country, up from 3,091 (9,648th-most-common) in the 2000 Census. In both censuses, slightly less than nine-tenths of the bearers of the surname identified as non-Hispanic white, and slightly less than one-tenth as Asian.

People with this surname include:

 Andrew Shue (born 1967), American actor
 Elisabeth Shue (born 1963), American actress; sister of Andrew
 Gene Shue (1931–2022), American basketball player and coach
 Henry Shue (born 1940), American philosopher
 Larry Shue (1946–1985), American playwright and actor
 Shue Meei-Shya (born 1949), Taiwanese archer
 Shue Ming-fa (born 1950), Taiwanese cyclist
 Shue Ming-shu (born 1940), Taiwanese cyclist
 Vivienne Shue (born 1944), American sinologist

See also
Scheu, surname

References

Americanized surnames
Multiple Chinese surnames